Now Is the Time is the fourth full live album by the band Delirious?. In June 2006, Delirious? attended Willow Creek Community Church to record a live concert DVD. The DVD is accompanied with a CD, and it was released in the UK on 9 October and in the USA on 17 October.

Track listing

CD
 "Here I Am Send Me" (Martin Smith, Stu Garrard, Jon Thatcher, Stewart Smith, Tim Jupp)
 "Rain Down" (Smith, Garrard) / "Did You Feel the Mountains Tremble? – Reprise" (Smith)
 "Solid Rock" (Smith, Garrard, Thatcher, Smith, Jupp)
 "Now Is the Time" (Smith, Garrard, Thatcher, Smith, Jupp, Matt Redman)
 "Our God Reigns" (Smith, Garrard, Thatcher, Smith, Jupp)
 "What a Friend I've Found" (Smith)
 "Miracle Maker" (Smith, Garrard, Thatcher, Smith, Jupp)
 "Paint the Town Red" (Smith, Garrard, Thatcher, Smith, Jupp)
 "Every Little Thing" (Smith, Garrard)
 "I Could Sing of Your Love Forever" (Smith)
 "Take Off My Shoes" (Smith, Garrard, Thatcher, Smith, Jupp)
 "Majesty (Here I Am)" (Garrard, Smith)
 "Our God Reigns – Reprise" (Smith, Garrard, Thatcher, Smith, Jupp)
 "All This Time" (Smith, Garrard, Thatcher, Smith, Jupp)
 "Our God Reigns" Radio Edit (Smith, Garrard, Thatcher, Smith, Jupp)

DVD
 "Here I Am Send Me" (Smith, Garrard, Thatcher, Smith, Jupp)
 "Rain Down" (Smith, Garrard)
 "Did You Feel the Mountains Tremble? – Reprise" (Smith)
 "Solid Rock" (Smith, Garrard, Thatcher, Smith, Jupp)
 "Now Is the Time" (Smith, Garrard, Thatcher, Smith, Jupp, Redman)
 "Our God Reigns" (Smith, Garrard, Thatcher, Smith, Jupp)
 "What a Friend I've Found" (Smith)
 "Miracle Maker" (Smith, Garrard, Thatcher, Smith, Jupp)
 "History Maker" (Smith)
 "Paint the Town Red" (Smith, Garrard, Thatcher, Smith, Jupp)
 "Every Little Thing" (Smith, Garrard) / "I Could Sing of Your Love Forever" (Smith)
 "Take Off My Shoes" (Smith, Garrard, Thatcher, Smith, Jupp)
 "Majesty (Here I Am)" (Garrard, Smith)
 "Our God Reigns – Reprise" (Smith, Garrard, Thatcher, Smith, Jupp)
 "Investigate" (Smith, Garrard)

References

Delirious? albums
2006 live albums
2006 video albums
Live video albums
Christian live video albums